Alūksne Municipality is a municipality in Vidzeme, Latvia. It is located in the northeast of the country and borders Ape in the west, Balvi Municipality, Gulbene Municipality and Alūksne Municipality in the south, Pskov Oblast of Russia in the east and Võru County of Estonia in the north. The administrative center of the municipality is Alūksne.

History
The municipality was formed in 2009 by merging Alsviķi parish, Anna parish, Ilzene parish, Jaunalūksne parish, Jaunanna parish, Jaunlaicene parish, Kalncempji parish, Liepna parish, Maliena parish, Mālupe parish, Mārkalne parish, Pededze parish, Veclaicene parish, Zeltiņi parish, Ziemeri parish, and the town of Alūksne.

Twin towns — sister cities

Alūksne is twinned with:

 Strugo-Krasnensky District, Russia
 Ostrovsky District, Russia
 Pechorsky District, Russia
 Pskov, Russia
 Haanja, Estonia
 Misso, Estonia
 Rõuge, Estonia
 Vastseliina, Estonia
 Võru, Estonia
 Sundbyberg, Sweden
 Wettin-Löbejün, Germany

See also
Administrative divisions of Latvia

References

 
Municipalities of Latvia